Platinum is the title of the third studio album recorded, but only the second to be released, by American country music artist Dean Miller. It was released in 2005 on Koch Records. It followed an unreleased second album, Just Me, which he recorded in 2002 for Universal South Records. Platinum produced only one non-charting single prior to the closure of Koch's country division. "I've Been a Long Time Leaving" was written by Miller's father, Roger Miller, and previously recorded by Waylon Jennings on his album Dreaming My Dreams. The track "Right Now" was previously recorded by the short-lived band Rushlow on their 2003 album of the same name.

References
"Hard Love" (Dean Miller, Liz Rose) – 3:16
"105" (Fred Eaglesmith) – 2:56
"Ready for the Rain" (D. Miller, Rose) – 3:00
"Whiskey Wings" (D. Miller, Eric Church) – 3:08
"Stronger Than Your Love" (D. Miller, Casey Koesel) – 2:59
"I've Been a Long Time Leaving" (Roger Miller) – 2:34
"Coming Back to You" (D. Miller, Lindy Robbins) – 4:08
"On a Good Day" (D. Miller) – 3:35
"Right Now" (D. Miller, Danny Orton) – 3:07
"Yes Man" (D. Miller, Troy Olsen) – 2:49
"Music Executive" (D. Miller) – 3:40

References

2005 albums
E1 Music albums
Dean Miller albums